Elke Arenholz is a German American physicist working in the field magnetic materials and X-ray spectroscopy, where she pioneered the use of superconducting vector magnets to study X-ray magnetic circular dichroism (XMCD). She is the associate director of the Cornell High Energy Synchrotron Source (CHESS).

Education and career 
Arenholz earned her masters of science from the University of Regensburg. She then received her PhD from the Free University of Berlin, in Germany, where she started using x-rays to study magnetic materials.

In 1996, Arenholz joined the Advanced Light Source (ALS), in Berkeley, California as postdoctoral fellow, before joining the staff in 2000. Her first project there, an eight pole electromagnet providing magnetic fields up to  0.8 T in arbitrary directions relative to the incoming x-ray beam, was the first device installed at a synchrotron that could apply the magnetic field in any direction. In 2011, her team completed a first-of-its-kind superconducting vector magnet, similar to the eight pole magnet but providing up to 5 T in arbitrary directions.

From 2013 to 2019, she was also an adjunct associate professor in the Department of Materials Science and Engineering, at the University of California, Berkeley. She became a fellow of the American Physical Society in 2014. In 2019, she joined CHESS in Ithaca, NY, as the associate director.

In addition to the research she conducts at the ALS, Arenholz is a journal editor for AIP Advances, on the editorial board of the Journal of Magnetism and Magnetic Materials (JMMM), and was a program co-chair for the 2013 Joint MMM/Intermag Conference.

References

Year of birth missing (living people)
Living people
21st-century American physicists
American women physicists
21st-century German physicists
German women physicists
University of Regensburg alumni
Free University of Berlin alumni
Cornell University staff
Fellows of the American Physical Society
21st-century American women scientists